Mamadou Diallo may refer to:

Mamadou Diallo (footballer, born 1971), Senegalese footballer
Mamadou Alimou Diallo (born 1984), Guinean football defender
Mamadou Diallo (athlete) (born 1954), Senegalese track and field athlete
Mamadou Diallo (footballer, born 1982), Malian footballer
Mamadou Diallo (judoka) (born 1941), Guinean Olympic judoka
Mamadou Diallo (wrestler), Mauritanian wrestler
Mamadou Diaw Diallo, Guinean wrestler
Mamadou Diallo (footballer, born 1990), Guinean football forward who played for Hougang United FC
Mamadou Diallo (footballer, born 1994), Guinean football forward who plays for Grenoble 
Mamadou Diallo (footballer, born 1995), Guinean football forward who plays for Águia FC Vimioso
Mamadou Diallo (footballer, born 1997), Guinean football forward who plays for Energetik-BGU Minsk
Mamadou Sylla Diallo (born 1994), Senegalese footballer
Mamadou Mariem Diallo (born 1967), Senegalese footballer